Bethell v Hildyard 38 Ch.D. 220. [1885 B. 2119.] is an important legal judgment of the Chancery Division of the High Court of Justice, England. The matter heard before Justice Striling concerned succession to property by the child of a marriage contracted by Christopher Bethell, an English man in Bechuanaland South Africa with Teepoo, a Barolong woman according to the customs of the Baralong people.

The marriage was held not to be a valid marriage according to the law of England because the customs of the Baralong people permitted polygamy. The child was held not entitled to succeed to her father's property.

Related cases
 Warrender v. Warrender
 Hyde v Hyde
 Hussain v Hussain (1983) Fam 26.
 Corbett v Corbett

See also
 Legal status of polygamy
 List of polygamy court cases
 Void marriage

References

English family case law
1885 in British law
1885 in case law
1885 in Bechuanaland Protectorate
Polygamy law
Marriage law in the United Kingdom
Disrupted marriage